In mathematics, given a non-empty set of objects of finite extension in -dimensional space, for example a set of points, a bounding sphere, enclosing sphere or enclosing ball for that set is an -dimensional solid sphere containing all of these objects.

Used in computer graphics and computational geometry, a bounding sphere is a special type of bounding volume. There are several fast and simple bounding sphere construction algorithms with a high practical value in real-time computer graphics applications.

In statistics and operations research, the objects are typically points, and generally the sphere of interest is the minimal bounding sphere, that is, the  sphere with minimal radius among all bounding spheres. It may be proven that such a sphere is unique: If there are two of them, then the objects in question lie within their intersection. But an intersection of two non-coinciding spheres of equal radius is contained in a sphere of smaller radius.

The problem of computing the center of a minimal bounding sphere is also known as the "unweighted Euclidean 1-center problem".

Applications

Clustering
Such spheres are useful in clustering, where groups of similar data points are classified together.

In statistical analysis the scattering of data points within a sphere may be attributed to measurement error or natural (usually thermal) processes, in which case the cluster represents a perturbation of an ideal point. In some circumstances this ideal point may be used as a substitute for the points in the cluster, advantageous in reducing calculation time.

In operations research the clustering of values to an ideal point may also be used to reduce the number of inputs in order to obtain approximate values for NP-hard problems in a reasonable time. The point chosen is not usually the center of the sphere, as this can be biased by outliers, but instead some form of average location such as a least squares point is computed to represent the cluster.

Algorithms
There are exact and approximate algorithms for the solving bounding sphere problem.

Linear programming
Nimrod Megiddo studied the 1-center problem extensively and published on it at least five times in the 1980s. In 1983, he proposed a "prune and search" algorithm which finds the optimum bounding sphere and runs in linear time if the dimension is fixed as a constant. Megiddo used this linear programming approach in linear time when dimension is fixed.

In 1991, Emo Welzl proposed a much simpler randomized algorithm based in the extension of a randomized linear programming algorithm by Raimund Seidel. It runs in expected linear time. The paper provides experimental results demonstrating its practicality in higher dimensions.

The open-source Computational Geometry Algorithms Library (CGAL) contains an implementation of this algorithm.

Ritter's bounding sphere
In 1990, Jack Ritter proposed a simple algorithm to find a non-minimal bounding sphere. It is widely used in various applications for its simplicity. The algorithm works in this way:

Otherwise, let  be a point outside the ball, construct a new ball covering both point  and previous ball. Repeat this step until all points are covered.

Ritter's algorithm runs in time  on inputs consisting of  points in -dimensional space, which makes it very efficient. However it gives only a coarse result which is usually 5% to 20% larger than the optimum.

Core-set based approximation
Bădoiu et al. presented a  approximation to the bounding sphere problem, where a  approximation means that the constructed sphere has radius at most , where  is the smallest possible radius of a bounding sphere.

A coreset is a small subset, that a  expansion of the solution on the subset is a bounding sphere of the whole set. The coreset is constructed incrementally by adding the farthest point into the set in each iteration.

Kumar et al. improved this approximation algorithm so that it runs in time .

Fischer's exact solver
Fischer et al. (2003) proposed an exact solver, though the algorithm does not have a polynomial running time in the worst case. The algorithm is purely combinatorial and implements a pivoting scheme similar to the simplex method for linear programming, used earlier in some heuristics. It starts with a large sphere that covers all points and gradually shrinks it until it cannot be shrunk further. The algorithm features correct termination rules in cases of degeneracies, overlooked by prior authors; and efficient handling of partial solutions, which produces a major speed-up. The authors verified that the algorithm is efficient in practice in low and moderately low (up to 10,000) dimensions and claim it does not exhibit numerical stability problems in its floating-point operations. A C++ implementation of the algorithm is available as an open-source project.

Extremal points optimal sphere 
 proposed the "extremal points optimal sphere" method with controllable speed to accuracy approximation to solve the bounding sphere problem. An exact solver is applied to the  extremal points of these projections. The algorithm then iterates over the remaining points, if any, growing the sphere if necessary. For large  this method is orders of magnitude faster than exact methods, while giving comparable results.

See also 
Bounding volume
Circumscribed sphere, circumscribed circle

References

External links 
 Smallest Enclosing Circle Problem – describes several algorithms for enclosing a point set, including Megiddo's linear-time algorithm

Geometric algorithms
Spheres